Everything Changes may refer to:

"Everything Changes" (Torchwood), the first episode of the British science-fiction series Torchwood
Everything Changes (Julian Lennon album), 2011
Everything Changes (Take That album), 1993
"Everything Changes" (Take That song), the title track
Everything Changes (Peggy Seeger album), 2014
"Everything Changes" (Markus Fagervall song)
"Everything Changes", a song by Little Big Town from Little Big Town
"Everything Changes", a song from Pokémon 2.B.A. Master
"Everything Changes", a song by Kathy Troccoli from Pure Attraction
"Everything Changes", a song by Scatman John from Scatman's World
"Everything Changes" (Staind song), 2006